Polytechnics and university of applied sciences mean the same thing in Finland. The following 24 (as of 2021) current universities of applied sciences are also similar to the German Fachhochschule. The official Finnish and Swedish terms are ammattikorkeakoulu (AMK) and yrkeshögskola (YH). Except for the Åland University of Applied Sciences (Government of Åland) and the Police College of Finland (Ministry of the Interior), all polytechnics operate under the jurisdiction of the Finnish Ministry of Education.

Defunct
EVTEK University of Applied Sciences (EVTEK) to form Metropolia 2008-08-01
HAAGA University of Applied Sciences (HAAGA) to form Haaga-Helia 2007-01-01
Helsinki Business Polytechnic (Helia) to form Haaga-Helia 2007-01-01
Helsinki Polytechnic Stadia (Stadia) to form Metropolia 2008-08-01
Pirkanmaa University of Applied Sciences (PIRAMK) to form TAMK 2010-01-01
Swedish Polytechnic (SYH) to form Novia 2008-08-01
Sydväst Polytechnic (Sydväst) to form Novia 2008-08-01
Kemi-Tornio University of Applied Sciences (KTAMK) to form Lapin AMK 2014-01-01
Rovaniemi University of Applied Sciences (RAMK) to form Lapin AMK 2014-01-01
Kymenlaakso University of Applied Sciences (KyAMK) to form XAMK 2017-01-01
Mikkeli University of Applied Sciences (MAMK) to form XAMK 2017-01-01
Lahti University of Applied Sciences (LAMK) to form LAB 2020-01-01
Saimaa University of Applied Sciences (Saimaan AMK) to form LAB 2020-01-01

See also
Ammattikorkeakoulu
Education in Finland
List of universities in Finland
List of colleges and universities
List of colleges and universities by country
List of schools in Finland

References

Polytechnics
Finland